Social activity may refer to:
 Agency (sociology), the individual (or 'micro') component of the structure and agency debate
 Agency (philosophy), the similar but distinct concept in philosophical action theory
 Social relations, the fundamental topic of analysis for social scientists
 Interpersonal relationship
 Social action, a Weberian concept in sociology relating to social 'actors' and their causes and effects
 Human migration, the movement of human beings from one area to another

See also
 Society
 Culture
 Civilization
 Social structure
 Theory of structuration
 Action theory (sociology)
 Base Superstructure paradigm

Social science disambiguation pages